Asthenotricha argyridia is a moth in the family Geometridae first described by Arthur Gardiner Butler in 1894. It is found in the Democratic Republic of the Congo, Kenya, Rwanda and Uganda.

References

Moths described in 1894
Asthenotricha
Moths of Africa